The Statesboro Northern Railway began operating in 1924 on 44 miles of former Midland Railway between Statesboro, Georgia and Stevens Crossing, Georgia. It was immediately leased by the Georgia and Florida Railway, and was completely abandoned in 1950.

Defunct Georgia (U.S. state) railroads
Predecessors of the Southern Railway (U.S.)
Railway companies established in 1924
Railway companies disestablished in 1950